Win Maung may refer to:

 Mahn Win Maung (1916–1989), third president of the Union of Burma (Myanmar)
 Win Maung (boxer) (born 1946), Burmese boxer
 Win Maung (footballer) (born 1949), Burmese footballer